Guilty by Affiliation is the third solo studio album by American rapper WC. It was released on August 14, 2007 via Lench Mob Records. Production was handled by Hallway Productionz, Emile, D-Mac, Jelly Roll, Laylaw, Mr. Porter, Nottz, Rick Rock, The Legendary Traxster, and Ice Cube, who served as co-producer and executive producer. It features guest appearances from Ice Cube, Butch Cassidy, Snoop Dogg and The Game. The album peaked at number 49 on the Billboard 200, at number six on the Top R&B/Hip-Hop Albums and at number five on the Top Rap Albums in the United States. The song "This Is Los Angeles" was used in David Ayer's 2008 film Street Kings.

Track listing

Charts

References

External links

2007 albums
WC (rapper) albums
Albums produced by Nottz
Albums produced by Laylaw
Albums produced by JellyRoll
Albums produced by Rick Rock
Albums produced by Mr. Porter
Albums produced by Emile Haynie
Albums produced by The Legendary Traxster